Nesyamun, also known as Natsef-Amun or The Leeds Mummy, was an Ancient Egyptian priest, who lived c.1100 BC. His remains are now held in the collection of Leeds City Museum in Yorkshire, England.

Life
Nesyamun was a priest, incense-bearer, and scribe at the Egyptian temple complex at Karnak in Thebes. He died in approximately 1100 BC.

Mummification
After death, his body was preserved and entombed in a coffin inscribed with hieroglyphs. His remains are considered one of the most remarkable mummies in Britain. His body has been kept at Leeds City Museum since 1823. Nesyamun's coffins are among the best-researched of their kind.

Second World War bombing damage
Originally part of a trio, Nesyamun was the only mummy without significant damage after the Leeds Blitz bombing of 1941 which destroyed the front half of the museum. Nesyamun's remains were intact and suffered no damage, even though the inner lid to the coffin was smashed during the bombings.

Recent history
In 1990, the Director of Leeds City Museum invited the Manchester Mummy Team led by Rosalie David to undertake a new scientific study of Nesyamun. In 1973, the multi-disciplinary team began researching the living conditions, diseases, and causes of death of the ancient Egyptian population, and also to establish formal, non-destructive methods of examining mummified remains. The International Mummy Database founded at the Manchester Museum in 1979 is recognised as the major centre for the collection and storage of mummy-related information.

Since 2002, the Leeds Museum has been documenting and researching both the decoration upon the coffin, and the coffin itself. This has led to a greater understanding of the nature of the roles that Nesyamun, as a priest at the temple of Karnak, would have played.

In 2008, the mummy was moved to a new home at the Leeds City Museum.

Voice reconstruction
In 2020, after Nesyamun's throat and trachea were found to be remarkably well-preserved, scientists were able to reconstruct and simulate how the priest's voice may have sounded. Piero Cosi, a speech scientist who in 2016 was part of a team which roughly reconstructed the voice of another widely studied mummy, Ötzi, maintained that the reconstruction was largely speculative even with Nesyamun's almost perfectly preserved vocal tract. Scholars have debated the ethics and value of the project.

References

Further reading

Wassell, Belinda The Coffin of Nesyamun: the "Leeds Mummy", illustrations by Thomas Small. The Leeds Philosophical and Literary Society, 2008. 

Ancient Egyptian mummies
Tourist attractions in Leeds
Leeds Museums and Galleries Project